The 6 Hours of Mexico was a sports car race held at Autódromo Hermanos Rodríguez in Mexico City, Mexico.  The race was first held in 1974 as part of the IMSA GT Championship. Fifteen years later, in 1989, the World Sportscar Championship reintroduced it as a 480 km event, and was held three times before the championship's demise.  It was again revived in 2016 as a part of the FIA World Endurance Championship.

Results

References

External links
Racing Sports Cars: Mexico City archive

 
Recurring sporting events established in 1989
1989 establishments in Mexico